South Fork Coyote Wash is a 4 mile long tributary ephemeral stream or wash of Coyote Wash, in Imperial County, California.

References

South Fork Coyote Wash
Geography of the Colorado Desert
Rivers of Southern California